The 40th National Film Awards, presented by Directorate of Film Festivals, the organisation set up by Ministry of Information and Broadcasting, India to felicitate the best of Indian Cinema released in the year 1992. Ceremony took place in 1993.

Awards 

Awards were divided into feature films, non-feature films and books written on Indian cinema.

Lifetime Achievement Award

Feature films 

Feature films were awarded at All India as well as regional level. For 40th National Film Awards, a Sanskrit film, Bhagavad Gita won the National Film Award for Best Feature Film and a Tamil film, Thevar Magan won the maximum number of awards (5). Following were the awards given in each category:

Juries 

A committee headed by Balu Mahendra was appointed to evaluate the feature films awards. Following were the jury members:

 Jury Members
 Balu Mahendra (Chairperson)Sai ParanjpyeSwapan Kumar GhoshK. D. ShoreyHema MehtaT. S. MohanaBijaya JenaV. K. PavithranBasu ChatterjeeSurinder SinghAnil SaariSabyasachi MohapatraT. S. NagabharanaSurjya Hazarika

All India Award 

Following were the awards given:

Golden Lotus Award 

Official Name: Swarna Kamal

All the awardees are awarded with 'Golden Lotus Award (Swarna Kamal)', a certificate and cash prize.

Silver Lotus Award 

Official Name: Rajat Kamal

All the awardees are awarded with 'Silver Lotus Award (Rajat Kamal)', a certificate and cash prize.

Regional Awards 

The award is given to best film in the regional languages in India.

Best Feature Film in Each of the Language Other Than Those Specified in the Schedule VIII of the Constitution

Non-Feature Films 

Short Films made in any Indian language and certified by the Central Board of Film Certification as a documentary/newsreel/fiction are eligible for non-feature film section.

Juries 

A committee headed by Ghanashyam Mohapatra was appointed to evaluate the non-feature films awards. Following were the jury members:

 Jury Members
 Ghanashyam Mohapatra (Chairperson)Serbjeet SinghP. B. PendharkarLenin Rajendran

Golden Lotus Award 

Official Name: Swarna Kamal

All the awardees are awarded with 'Golden Lotus Award (Swarna Kamal)', a certificate and cash prize.

Silver Lotus Award 

Official Name: Rajat Kamal

All the awardees are awarded with 'Silver Lotus Award (Rajat Kamal)' and cash prize.

Best Writing on Cinema 

The awards aim at encouraging study and appreciation of cinema as an art form and dissemination of information and critical appreciation of this art-form through publication of books, articles, reviews etc.

Juries 

A committee headed by Mrinal Pande was appointed to evaluate the writing on Indian cinema. Following were the jury members:

 Jury Members
 Mrinal Pande (Chairperson)Gautaman BhaskaranShirshendu Mukhopadhyay

Golden Lotus Award 
Official Name: Swarna Kamal

All the awardees are awarded with 'Golden Lotus Award (Swarna Kamal)' and cash prize.

Awards not given 

Following were the awards not given as no film was found to be suitable for the award:

 Best Feature Film in Manipuri
 Best Feature Film in Punjabi
 Best Historical Reconstruction / Compilation Film

References

External links 
 National Film Awards Archives
 Official Page for Directorate of Film Festivals, India

National Film Awards (India) ceremonies
1993 Indian film awards